The Brat is a 1931 American Pre-Code comedy film directed by John Ford, starring Sally O'Neil, and featuring Virginia Cherrill. The film is based on the 1917 play by Maude Fulton. A previous silent film had been made in 1919 with Alla Nazimova. This 1931 screen version has been updated to then contemporary standards i.e. clothing, speech, topics in the news.

Plot
A novelist brings a wild chorus girl home, hoping to study her for inspiration for his new novel. His snobby upper-class family is upset by her presence, but soon she has changed their lives forever.

Background
Writer Maude Fulton was an actress as well and starred in the 1917 Broadway premiere of her own play. Two of her co-stars in the play went on to have major film careers, Lewis Stone and Edmund Lowe. The film was restored in DCP form and exhibited at New York City's Museum of Modern Art in November 2016.

Cast
 Sally O'Neil as the Brat
 Alan Dinehart as Macmillan Forester
 Frank Albertson as Stephen Forester
 William Collier, Sr. as Judge O"Flaherty
 Virginia Cherrill as Angela
 June Collyer as Jane
 J. Farrell MacDonald as Timson, the butler
 Mary Forbes as Mrs. Forester
 Albert Gran as Bishop
 Louise Mackintosh as Lena
 Margaret Mann as Housekeeper
 Ward Bond as Court Policeman (uncredited)
 Mary Gordon as Angry Wife in Night Court (uncredited)
 George Humbert as Italian Restaurant Owner (uncredited)
 Cyril McLaglen as Cyril (uncredited)
 Philip Sleeman as Masher in Night Court (uncredited)

References

External links

1931 films
1931 comedy films
American comedy films
American black-and-white films
Films directed by John Ford
Films with screenplays by Sonya Levien
Fox Film films
1930s English-language films
1930s American films